Prince Ludwig Gaston of Saxe-Coburg and Gotha (Ludwig Gaston Klemens Maria Michael Gabriel Raphael Gonzaga; 15 September 1870 – 23 January 1942), known in Brazil as Dom Luís Gastão, was a German prince of the House of Saxe-Coburg and Gotha-Koháry, and the last surviving grandchild of Emperor Pedro II of Brazil.

Biography

Early life
Ludwig Gaston was born at Schloss Ebenthal (Niederösterreich) in Ebenthal, Lower Austria in Austria-Hungary, the youngest son of Prince Ludwig August of Saxe-Coburg and Gotha and Princess Leopoldina of Brazil, the second daughter of Dom Pedro II. His siblings were Princes Peter August, August Leopold and Joseph Ferdinand. Shortly after their mother's death in 1871, Ludwig and his brothers moved to Brazil, where they lived with their maternal grandfather until a military coup d'état in 1889 abolished the monarchy, forcing the imperial family into exile.

Military and later life

Ludwig Gaston went to Wiener Neustadt to study at the Theresian Military Academy, where he successfully graduated in 1892. After that, he was promoted to the rank of Lieutenant of the Fourth Tiroler Jäger-Regiment of the Austro-Hungarian Army in Lienz. On 1 May 1896, Ludwig obtained the rank of First Lieutenant; on 29 March 1900, he was given command of the First Tiroler Jäger-Regiment in Innsbruck, and on 1 May 1903, he further advanced to the rank of Captain. He left the army on 8 February 1907.

In Munich, on 1 May 1900, the prince married firstly Princess Mathilde, daughter of King Ludwig III of Bavaria. Their wedding was hosted by her grandfather, Luitpold, Prince Regent of Bavaria. They had two children: 
Antonius Maria Ludwig Klemens Eugen Karl Heinrich August Luitpold Leopold Franz Wolfgang Peter Gaston Alexander Alfons Ignatius Aloysius Stanislaus (Innsbruck, 17 June 1901 – Haar, 1 September 1970), married on 14 May 1938 to Luise Mayrhofer, without issue. 
Maria Immaculata Leopoldine Franziska Theresia Ildefonsa Adelgunde Klementine Hildegard Anna Josepha Elisabeth Sancta-Angelica Nicoletta (Innsbruck, 10 September 1904 – Varese, Italy, 18 March 1940), unmarried and without issue.

After the death of his first wife in 1906, he married for a second time Countess Anna of Trauttmansdorff-Weinsberg, daughter of Karl Johann Nepomuk Ferdinand, Prince von und zu Trauttmansdorff-Weinsberg and Josephine, Markgräfin von Pallavicini,  (1873 – 1948) at Bischofteinitz on November 30, 1907. They had one daughter:
Josefine Maria Anna Leopoldine Amalie Klementine Ludovica Theresia Gabriela Gonzaga (Schloß Vogelsang, 20 September 1911 – Stockdorf, 27 November 1997), married on 12 May 1937 to Richard, Freiherr von Baratta-Dragono (1901 – 1998), with issue; divorced in 1945.

Death
Prince Ludwig Gaston died on 23 January 1942 in Innsbruck, and was buried in the St. Augustine's Church in Coburg.

Titles, styles and honours

Titles and styles
 15 September 1870 – 23 January 1942: His Highness Prince Ludwig Gaston of Saxe-Coburg and Gotha, Duke of Saxony

Honours
 Grand Cross of the Saxe-Ernestine House Order, 1892
 Knight of the Order of St. Hubert, 1900

Ancestry

Bibliography
 Defrance, Olivier. La Médicis des Cobourg, Clémentine d’Orléans, Bruxelles, Racine, 2007
 Bragança, Dom Carlos Tasso de Saxe-Coburgo e. A Princesa Leopoldina, in Revista do Instituto Histórico e Geográfico Brasileiro, vol. 243, 1959 (ISSN 0101-4366)
 Bragança, Dom Carlos Tasso de Saxe-Coburgo e. Palácio Leopoldina, in Revista do Instituto Histórico e Geográfico Brasileiro, vol. 438, 2008 (ISSN 0101-4366)

References

1870 births
1942 deaths
People from Klagenfurt-Land
Princes of Saxe-Coburg and Gotha
House of Saxe-Coburg-Gotha-Koháry
Theresian Military Academy alumni